Sir William Barne (c. 1558 – 9 May 1619) was an English landowner and politician from Kent.

Origins
He was the eldest son of Sir George Barne (1532–1592), of Woolwich, and his wife Anne, daughter of Sir William Garrard. His father, a London merchant, had been Lord Mayor of London and an MP for the City of London.

Life
As his father's heir in 1592, he became a Kent landowner and was appointed a Justice of the Peace for the county from 1596. Before then, he was elected to the 1593 Parliament as MP for Great Grimsby. He was knighted in 1603.

Apart from his one foray into national politics and some work for the government, he seems to have spent his life participating in county affairs and managing his lands in Woolwich, Plumstead and Bexley. He also developed literary friendships, among his correspondents being John Chamberlain, Sir Dudley Carleton and Sir Henry Savile.

Family
In 1586, when he was about 24, he married Anne, daughter of Edwin Sandys, the Archbishop of York, and his wife Cecily, daughter of Sir Thomas Wilford and half-sister of Sir James Wilford. Their children included:
Sir William (born 1593), his heir, who married Dorothy, daughter of the MP Sir Peter Manwood.
Robert (died after 1632), of Grimsby, who married Elizabeth, daughter of Thomas Twysden and niece of Sir William Twysden, 1st Baronet.
Miles (born 1600), who became a parson in Kent and married Jane, daughter of Henry Travers, a London lawyer.
Anne (died 1633), who married Sir William Lovelace, becoming the mother of the poet Richard Lovelace and of Francis Lovelace, Governor of New York.
After his death, his widow married Edward Pulter (died 1626).

References 

1550s births
1619 deaths
Year of birth uncertain
People from Woolwich
Members of the Parliament of England for Great Grimsby
English MPs 1593
English justices of the peace
Knights Bachelor
Politicians awarded knighthoods